George Henry Robert Child Villiers, 8th Earl of Jersey DL (2 June 1873 – 31 December 1923), was a British peer and Conservative politician from the Villiers family.

Villiers was the son of Victor Child Villiers, 7th Earl of Jersey, and the Honourable Margaret Elizabeth, daughter of William Henry Leigh, 2nd Baron Leigh.

Public life
Villiers was educated at Eton College and at New College, Oxford for university. He succeeded his father in the earldom in 1915 and served briefly as a Lord-in-waiting under David Lloyd George between January and August 1919. He was a Justice of the peace and deputy lieutenant in Oxfordshire and an alderman and vice chairman for Oxfordshire County Council and a high steward for the city of Oxford. Also a J.P. and an Alderman for Middlesex. Lord Jersey sold the Child & Co bank, part of the family's inheritance since the 5th Earl married into the Child family, to Glyn, Mills & Co. Bank in 1923. He was a member of the Ancient Order of Druids since 1905.

Family

Lord Jersey married Lady Cynthia Almina Constance Mary Needham, daughter of Francis Needham, 3rd Earl of Kilmorey, and Ellen Constance Baldock, on 8 October 1908. They had four children:

 George Child Villiers, 9th Earl of Jersey (1910 – 1998).
 Lady Joan Child Villiers (1911–2010), married David Colville, (who died 1986) grandson of Charles Colville, 1st Viscount Colville of Culross.
 Hon. (Edward) Mansel Child Villiers (3 May 1913 – 9 March 1980), married twice (firstly 1934, diss. 1940 to Barbara Mary Frampton and secondly 1946, diss. 1971 to Princess Maria Gloria Pignatelli Aragona Cortez.
 Lady Ann Child Villiers (1916 – 2006), married (1937) Major Alexander Henry Elliot (d. 1986).

Notes

References 

1873 births
1923 deaths
19th-century English nobility
20th-century English nobility
8
George Child Villiers, 8th Earl of Jersey
Conservative Party (UK) hereditary peers
Deputy Lieutenants of Oxfordshire
Earls in the Jacobite peerage
Members of Middlesex County Council
Members of the Ancient Order of Druids
Viscounts Grandison